James G. Whiting Memorial Field  is a city-owned public-use airport located one nautical mile (2 km) north of the central business district of Mapleton, a city in Monona County, Iowa, United States. It is included in the National Plan of Integrated Airport Systems for 2011–2015, which categorized it as a general aviation facility.

Although many U.S. airports use the same three-letter location identifier for the FAA and IATA, this airport is assigned MEY by the FAA but has no designation from the IATA (which assigned MEY to Meghauli Airport in Meghauli, Nepal).

Facilities and aircraft 
James G. Whiting Memorial Field covers an area of 164 acres (66 ha) at an elevation of 1,116 feet (340 m) above mean sea level. It has one runway designated 2/20 with a concrete surface measuring 2,801 by 60 feet (854 x 18 m).

For the 12-month period ending March 17, 2011, the airport had 3,250 general aviation aircraft operations, an average of 270 per month. At that time there were 10 aircraft based at this airport: 80% single-engine and 20% ultralight.

References

External links 
 James G. Whiting Memorial Field (MEY) at Iowa DOT Airport Directory
 Aerial image as of April 2000 from USGS The National Map
 

Airports in Iowa
Transportation buildings and structures in Monona County, Iowa